Birchwood is a housing estate in the south of Lincoln, Lincolnshire, England. The population of the Birchwood Ward of Lincoln City Council at the 2011 census was 8,520. It is built on the site of former RAF Skellingthorpe.

History
Birchwood and  Doddington Park are built on the site of the Second World War airfield RAF Skellingthorpe which had hosted No. 50 Squadron and No. 61 Squadron. There is a memorial at Birchwood Leisure Centre.

Amenities and community

The estate has a number of schools, including St Hughes Catholic Primary School and Leslie Manser Primary School which is named after Leslie Manser. This school has a small museum dedicated to finds found on the site when it was excavated, including the wing of a Spitfire. There is also Birchwood Junior School along with a special needs school called Fortuna. There are also several nursery and pre-junior schools.

The Birchwood shopping centre, in the middle of the estate was refurbished by the Lincolnshire Co-operative, who own the centre, in 2011. It houses a variety of amenities, as well as further residential space and a children's centre. Birchwood has takeaways, pubs and attractions and its own police station, and veterinary practice.

Hartsholme Country Park adjoins the village.

The church of St Luke and St Martin in Jasmin Road was designed in 1976 by Robert Read of Grantham; its ecclesiastical parish is Lincoln Birchwood St Luke. It is fully accessible for wheelchair users.  The Catholic Parish of St Peter & St Paul is in nearby Skellingthorpe Road and the parish oversees St Hugh's Primary School.  There is also a Methodist church.

"The Boiler House" community centre provides for a range of groups and activities.

Crime in Birchwood is described as high, the area coming 8th of 12 in Lincoln.

References

External links

Hartsholme Country Park

Areas of Lincoln, England
Housing estates in England